Azhari (Arabic أزهري) or with the article -al as in al-Azhari (Arabic الأزهري, literally belonging to Azhar) is a common surname. It may refer to:

Azhari
Abdul Ghani Azhari (1922–2023), Indian Muslim scholar and historian 
Aidul Fitriciada Azhari (born 1968), Indonesian judicial administrator
Akhtar Raza Khan Azhari (1943–2018), also known as Tajushshari'ah or Azhari Miya, an Indian Barelvi Muslim scholar
Ayu Azhari (born 1967), Indonesian actress and author
Che Husna Azhari (born 1955), Malaysian writer of literature
Gholam Reza Azhari (1912–2001), Iranian military leader and Prime Minister of Iran
Khaled Azhari (born 1966), Egyptian politician and government minister
Sarah Azhari (born 1978), Indonesian actress, model and singer
Yasmina Azhari, Syrian businesswoman

Al-Azhari
Abu Mansur al-Azhari (895–980)
Abdullah Quraishi Al-Azhari (1935–2015), Indian Islamic scholar 
Ahmed Saad Al-Azhari, Egyptian British Islamic scholar
Ismail al-Azhari (1900–1969), Sudanese nationalist and political figure
Muhammad Karam Shah al-Azhari (1918–1998), Pakistani Islamic scholar associated with Barelvi movement

See also 
Azhar (name)